Retrograde is an Australian narrative comedy series which first screened on the ABC in July 2020. It follows the lives of a group of thirty-something friends as they drown their sorrows at a virtual bar during the COVID-19 pandemic in Australia.

Cast
 Pallavi Sharda as Maddie
 Ilai Swindells as Ramsay
 Maria Angelico as Isabel
 Esther Hannaford as Sophie
 Nicholas Boshier as Dylan
 Max Brown as Rob

Guest cast
 Ronny Chieng as Glen
 Shapoor Batliwalla as Dad
 Julian Haig as Hot Alan
 Luxy Mu as Maya

Production
Retrograde is a six part series created by Mark O'Toole & Meg O'Connell and is directed by Natalie Bailey. The executive producer is Kurt Royan and producers are Meg O'Connell, Dan Lake, and Jackson Lapsley Scott. It is an Unless Pictures & Orange Entertainment Co production for the ABC.

The series was conceived of in the early stages of the COVID-19 pandemic in Australia, when O'Connell helped organise a virtual bar similar to the one featured in the show. She and Scott then pitched the idea to Que Minh Luu less than a week later, and the show began production.

The show was shot remotely via a series of Zoom calls between the producers, crew, and actors. Filming started in mid-June, just three weeks before its 8 July debut.

See also
 At Home Alone Together
 Connecting... - a US sitcom with a similar premise broadcast in the fall of 2020

References

External links
 
 Official website

2020 Australian television series debuts
Australian Broadcasting Corporation original programming
Australian comedy television series
Television shows about the COVID-19 pandemic